The Empty Family is a collection of short stories by Irish writer Colm Tóibín. It was published in the UK in October 2010 and was released in the US in January 2011.

Reception
The Empty Family was shortlisted for the 2011 Frank O'Connor International Short Story Award.

Reviews were generally positive. Bryan Lynch wrote in the Irish Independent that the "stories are always intensely interesting and sometimes profoundly provocative", noting that the sexually frank depictions required great courage. Keith Miller in The Daily Telegraph described the book as an "exquisite and almost excruciating collection". The Irish Times journalist Heather Ingman noted that most of Tóibín's familiar themes are present but with the addition of a "hard-won wisdom", giving rich rewards to the reader. Many reviewers commented on the fact that Tóibín's prose has become ever more spare and refined, with Ingman inviting readers "to read slowly and savour the silences between the words".

References

2010 short story collections
Books by Colm Tóibín
LGBT short story collections
Lambda Literary Award-winning works
Irish short story collections